Campiglossa lhommei is a species of tephritid or fruit flies in the genus Campiglossa of the family Tephritidae.

Distribution
The species is found in the United Kingdom, France, Russia.

References

Tephritinae
Insects described in 1936
Diptera of Europe